Anigraea is a genus of moths of the family Euteliidae. The genus was erected by Francis Walker in 1862.

Species
Anigraea albibasis Wileman & West, 1928 Philippines
Anigraea albomaculata (Hampson, 1894) Indian subregion, Thailand, Andamans, Borneo, Sulawesi
Anigraea cinctipalpis (Walker, 1865) Indian subregion, Peninsular Malaysia, Borneo, Philippines, New Guinea, Queensland
Anigraea deleta (Hampson, 1891) Indian subregion, Myanmar, Borneo, Java, New Guinea
Anigraea fulviceps Warren, 1914 Solomons, New Guinea
Anigraea homochroa Hampson, 1912 Borneo, New Guinea
Anigraea mediifascia (Hampson, 1894) Myanmar, Peninsular Malaysia, Singapore, Andamans, Sumatra, Borneo
Anigraea mediopunctata (Pagenstecher, 1900) Sundaland, Sulawesi, New Guinea, Bismarcks
Anigraea ochrobasis Hampson, 1912 Queensland
Anigraea particolor Warren, 1914 New Guinea
Anigraea pectinata Robinson, 1975 Fiji
Anigraea phaeopera Hampson, 1912 Peninsular Malaysia, Sumatra, Borneo
Anigraea purpurascens Hampson, 1912 Ghana
Anigraea rubida Walker, 1862 north-eastern Himalayas, Peninsular Malaysia, Taiwan, Borneo, Sulawesi
Anigraea rufibasis Warren, 1914 Solomon Islands
Anigraea serratilinea Warren, 1914 north-eastern Himalayas, Sundaland, Philippines, Sulawesi, New Guinea
Anigraea siccata (Hampson, 1905) Sierra Leone, Nigeria
Anigraea viridata (Bethune-Baker, 1906) New Guinea

References

Euteliinae
Noctuoidea genera